Sir John Marks Templeton (29 November 1912 – 8 July 2008) was an American-born British investor, banker, fund manager, and philanthropist. In 1954, he entered the mutual fund market and created the Templeton Growth Fund, which averaged growth over 15% per year for 38 years. A pioneer of emerging market investing in the 1960s, Money magazine named him "arguably the greatest global stock picker of the century" in 1999.

Early life and education
John Marks Templeton was born in the town of Winchester, Tennessee, and attended Yale University, where he was an assistant business manager for campus humor magazine Yale Record and was selected for membership in the Elihu society. He financed a portion of his tuition with winnings from playing poker, a game at which he excelled. He graduated in 1934 near the top of his class. He attended Balliol College in Oxford University as a Rhodes Scholar and earned an M.A. in law. He was a CFA charterholder and was a student of the "father of value investing", Benjamin Graham.

Investment career 
In 1939, Templeton, during the Depression of the 1930s, had his broker purchase 100 shares of each NYSE-listed company which was then selling for less than $1 a share ($ today) (104 companies, 34 in bankruptcy, in 1939), later making many times the money back when US industry picked up as a result of World War II.  According to Templeton, he called his broker the day World War II began and instructed him to make the purchases. This stratagem helped make him a wealthy man.

Templeton became a billionaire by pioneering the use of globally diversified mutual funds. His Templeton Growth Fund, Ltd. (investment fund), established in 1954, was among the first to invest in Japan in the middle of the 1960s. Templeton also created funds specifically in certain industries such as nuclear energy, chemicals, and electronics. By 1959, Templeton went public, with five funds and more than 66 million dollars under management.

In 2006 he was listed in a seven-way tie for 129th place on The Sunday Timess "Rich List".

Investment philosophy  
Money magazine in 1999 called him "arguably the greatest global stock picker of the century". Templeton attributed much of his success to his ability to maintain an elevated mood, avoid anxiety and stay disciplined. He rejected technical analysis for stock trading, preferring instead to use fundamental analysis. Thus he did not attempt to predict future stock movements, but paid close attention to valuation. From the late 1930s Templeton and his colleagues developed sophisticated quantitative finance methods that anticipated by decades now-common features such as the Shiller P/E, rebalancing and Tobin's q. 

Despite the name of his flagship fund, Templeton Growth Fund, he was more a practitioner of value investing rather than growth investing. Templeton focused on buying stocks he calculated were substantially undervalued, holding them until selling when their price rose to fair market value. His average holding period was about four years. He believed holding assets priced above fair market value in hopes they would further increase in price was speculation, not investing. However, Templeton did not buy stocks merely because they were undervalued but also took care investing in companies he determined were profitable, well-managed and with good long-term potential. 

By emphasizing  overlooked or unpopular stocks Templeton was in many ways a contrarian and became known for his "avoiding the herd" and "buy when there's blood in the streets" philosophy to take advantage of market turmoil. He also was known for taking profits when values and expectations were high. He was among the earliest American investors to devote substantial focus to investment opportunities in then-overlooked foreign markets such as Asia and Eastern Europe, and was such an early investor in Japan during the 1950s he had difficulty finding bi-lingual stockbrokers in either Japan or the United States to handle his firm's trades. Always on the lookout for bargain-priced stocks and hoping to avoid expensive stocks, he rotated out of Japanese stocks as they became more fashionable in the 1970s and turned to US stocks when they were at historic lows. 

In 2005, he wrote a brief memorandum predicting that within five years there would be financial chaos in the world, anticipating a collapse of the housing market and decline in yields on government-issued bonds to near zero. Templeton also predicted within the next few decades a major decrease in traditional schooling due to internet-based learning options. Initially privately circulated to family and a small number of Franklin-Templeton management, the memo was eventually made public in 2010.

Templeton was a Chartered Financial Analyst (CFA) charter-holder. He received AIMR's first award for professional excellence in 1991.

Personal life
Templeton married Judith Folk in 1937, and the couple had three children: John, Anne, and Christopher. Judith Templeton died in February 1951 in a motorbike accident. He remarried, to Irene Reynolds Butler in 1958; she died in 1993. A Christian, he was a lifelong member of the Presbyterian Church. He served as an elder of the First Presbyterian Church of Englewood (Englewood, New Jersey). He was a trustee on the board of Princeton Theological Seminary, the largest Presbyterian seminary, for 42 years and served as its chair for 12 years.

Uninterested in consumerism, he lived relatively frugally and never flew first-class. He lived year-round in the Bahamas. A friend jokingly described Templeton as Calvinist in his approach to wealth: "He believes it's okay to make money so long as you don't enjoy it."

On 8 July 2008, Templeton died at Doctors Hospital in Nassau, Bahamas, of pneumonia at 12:20. He was 95, and was survived by two sons, one of whom, John Templeton Jr., has since died, in 2015, of brain cancer.

Wealth and philanthropy 
Templeton was one of the most generous philanthropists in history, giving away over $1 billion to charitable causes. Templeton renounced his US citizenship in 1964, which some sources claim was a strategy to minimize taxes. However, in a 1997 interview with Charlie Rose, Templeton asserted the Bahamas had a higher tax rate than the United States and denied he renounced his citizenship to avoid paying taxes to the United States. He held dual naturalised Bahamian and British citizenship and lived in the Bahamas.

In 2007, Templeton was named one of Time magazine's 100 Most Influential People (Time 100) under the category of "Power Givers". Templeton was given this honour for his "pursuit of spiritual understanding, often through scientific research" through his establishment of the John Templeton Foundation.

As a philanthropist, Templeton established:

the Templeton Prize for Progress Toward Research or Discoveries about Spiritual Realities in 1972;
the Templeton Library in Sewanee, Tennessee (home of The University of the South); prominently overlooking the area, the building was to house his papers but is now used for private apartments;
the Templeton College of the University of Oxford (by endowing the Oxford Centre for Management Studies in 1983 to become a full college of the university by Royal Charter in 1995).

Templeton College is now closely associated with Oxford's Saïd Business School. In 2007, Templeton College transferred its executive education program to Saïd Business School. In 2008, Templeton College merged with Green College to form Green Templeton College. This is one of the exceptional mergers in recent history of the University of Oxford.

He was created a Knight Bachelor in 1987 for his philanthropic efforts. Templeton was inducted into the Junior Achievement US Business Hall of Fame in 1996, and in 2003 awarded the William E. Simon Prize for Philanthropic Leadership.

Templeton Religion Trust 
Templeton Religion Trust (TRT) is a global charitable trust chartered by Sir John Templeton in 1984, with headquarters in Nassau, The Bahamas, where Sir John lived until his death in 2008. TRT has been active since 2012 and supports projects and the dissemination of results from projects seeking to enrich the conversation about religion via three broad initiatives:

Improving the methods of inquiry into the existence and nature of spiritual realities.
Bringing about and enhancing the “conditions of possibility” of cooperative, constructive engagement (aka “Covenantal Pluralism”) in the context of religion.
Establishing the fact and improving our understanding of the underlying dynamics of the often overlooked or unforeseen benefits of religious faith and practice at its best.

TRT's aim is to improve the well-being of individuals and societies through spiritual growth and an ever-improving understanding of spiritual realities and spiritual information.

TRT is the first of three charitable entities established by Sir John Templeton. The other entities are the John Templeton Foundation and the Templeton World Charity Foundation. While all three organizations have similar aims, they operate as separate charitable entities.

John Templeton Foundation 
As a member of the Presbyterian Church, Templeton was dedicated to his faith.  However, Templeton eschewed dogma and declared relatively little was known about the divine through scripture, espousing what he called a "humble approach" to theology and remaining open to the benefits and values of other faiths. Commenting on his commitment to what he called spiritual progress, "But why shouldn't I try to learn more? Why shouldn't I go to Hindu services? Why shouldn't I go to Muslim services? If you are not egotistical, you will welcome the opportunity to learn more." Similarly, one of the major goals of the John Templeton Foundation is to proliferate the monetary support of spiritual discoveries. The John Templeton Foundation encourages research into "big questions" by awarding philanthropic aid to institutions and people who pursue the answers to such questions through "explorations into the laws of nature and the universe, to questions on the nature of love, gratitude, forgiveness, and creativity."

In an interview published in the Financial Intelligence Report in 2005, Templeton asserts that the purpose of the John Templeton Foundation is as follows: "We are trying to persuade people that no human has yet grasped 1% of what can be known about spiritual realities. So we are encouraging people to start using the same methods of science that have been so productive in other areas, in order to discover spiritual realities."

Publications and works 
The humble approach: Scientists discover God, 1981. 
Templeton Plan: 21 Steps to Personal Success and Real Happiness, 1992. 
Discovering the Laws of Life, 1994. 
Is God the Only Reality? Science Points to a Deeper Meaning of the Universe, 1994. 
Golden Nuggets from Sir John Templeton, 1997. 
Worldwide Laws of Life: 200 Eternal Spiritual Principles, 1998. .
Riches for the Mind and Spirit: John Marks Templeton's Treasury of Words to Help, Inspire, and Live By, 2006. 
Investing the Templeton Way: The Market-Beating Strategies of Value Investing's Legendary Bargain Hunter, 2007. 
Buying at the Point of Maximum Pessimism: Six Value Investing Trends from China to Oil to Agriculture, 2010.

See also
John Templeton Foundation
Templeton Prize
John Templeton Jr.
Franklin Templeton Investments
Benjamin Graham, another famous value investor and teacher of Templeton
Warren Buffett, another famous value investor and student of Benjamin Graham

References

External links

John Templeton Foundation
Profile of the John Templeton Foundation in The Nation
Obituary of Sir John Templeton in Philanthropy magazine
God's Venture Capitalist Slate article by David Plotz
16 Rules for Investment Success by Sir John Templeton
The John Templeton Award for Theological Promise A research award funded by the John Templeton Foundation
Contrarian, a documentary film about John Templeton

1912 births
2008 deaths
Alumni of Balliol College, Oxford
American stock traders
British spiritual writers
British money managers
British stock traders
British Presbyterians
Deaths from pneumonia in the Bahamas
Knights Bachelor
People from Winchester, Tennessee
Naturalised citizens of the United Kingdom
American Rhodes Scholars
Stock and commodity market managers
The Yale Record alumni
American emigrants to the United Kingdom
Former United States citizens
CFA charterholders
American emigrants to the Bahamas
British people of American descent
20th-century British philanthropists
Writers about religion and science
Yale University alumni
British philanthropists
American philanthropists
Member of the Mont Pelerin Society